Big Diamond Pond is a small lake southwest of Big Moose in Herkimer County, New York. It drains south via an unnamed creek that flows into the North Branch Moose River.

See also
 List of lakes in New York

References 

Lakes of New York (state)
Lakes of Herkimer County, New York